Janos Hajdu (Hungarian: János Hajdú; born 1948) is a Hungarian biophysicist. He is a professor of molecular biophysics at Uppsala University and a senior scientist at the Extreme Light Infrastructure beamline.

Education and career 
Hajdu was born in Budapest, Hungary and studied chemistry at Eötvös Loránd University. He received his PhD in biology from the Hungarian Academy of Sciences in 1980, working under Péter Friedrich and Brunó Ferenc Straub. He received a second PhD in physics from the same institution in 1994. Between 1981 and 1988, Hajdu worked at the University of Oxford under Louise Johnson and became a lecturer at Oxford afterwards. From 2004, Hajdu became a team leader at the SLAC National Accelerator Laboratory for coherent diffraction imaging, where his team had imaged live bacteria with ultrashort X-ray pulses.

Honors and awards 
Hajdu became a member of the Royal Society of Sciences in Uppsala since 2001. He received the Knut and Alice Wallenberg Award in 2011. In 2021, Hajdu was awarded the Gregori Aminoff Prize along with Henry Chapman and John Spence.

See also 
 Henry Chapman

References 

Living people
1948 births
People from Budapest
Eötvös Loránd University alumni
Academics of the University of Oxford
Hungarian biophysicists
Academic staff of Uppsala University
21st-century Hungarian physicists
Crystallographers